John Gavin (born Juan Vincent Apablasa; April 8, 1931 – February 9, 2018) was an American actor who was the president of the Screen Actors Guild (1971–73), and the United States Ambassador to Mexico (1981–86). Among the films he appeared in were A Time to Love and a Time to Die (1958), Imitation of Life (1959), Spartacus (1960), Psycho (1960), Midnight Lace (1960) and Thoroughly Modern Millie (1967), playing leading roles for producer Ross Hunter.

Life and career

Early life
Gavin was born in Los Angeles as Juan Vincent Apablasa II. His father, Juan Vincent Apablasa Sr., was of Chilean descent and his mother, Delia Diana Pablos, was a Mexican-born aristocrat. When Juan was two, his parents divorced and his mother married Herald Ray Golenor, who adopted Juan and changed his name to John Anthony Golenor.

After attending Roman Catholic schools, St. John's Military Academy (Los Angeles), and Villanova Preparatory (Ojai, California), he earned a Bachelor of Arts in Economics degree and Latin American affairs from Stanford University, where he did senior honors work in Latin American economic history and was a member of Chi Psi fraternity and Navy ROTC.

Military service
Due to Gavin's fluency in both Spanish and Portuguese, he was assigned as Flag Lieutenant to Admiral Milton E. Miles until he completed his four-year tour of duty in 1955. He received an award for his work in the Honduras floods of 1954.

In a 1960 interview, Gavin disputed rumors that he was born into wealth by revealing that he attended a preparatory school and Stanford University on scholarships.

Entry into acting
Following his naval service, Gavin offered himself as a technical adviser to family friend and film producer Bryan Foy, who was making a movie about the Princeton. Instead, Foy arranged a screen test for Gavin with Universal-International. Gavin initially refused the offer, but his father urged him to try it. The test was successful and Gavin signed with the studio. "They offered me so much money I couldn't resist", he said later.

Universal groomed Gavin as a leading man in the mold of Rock Hudson. He trained in Jess Kimmel's talent workshop under the name John Gilmore. His classmates included Grant Williams, Gia Scala and John Saxon. His first film was Raw Edge (1956) where he played the brother of Rory Calhoun and was billed as John Gilmore. His name was changed to John Gavin for the films Behind the High Wall (1956), Four Girls in Town (1957), and Quantez (also 1957). Gavin was meant to star in The Female Animal (1958) but was too busy on other projects and was replaced by George Nader.

Stardom: A Time to Love and a Time to Die
Gavin's break was the lead in A Time to Love and a Time to Die (1958), directed by Douglas Sirk from the novel by Erich Maria Remarque. His casting drew comparisons with the casting of the similarly inexperienced Lew Ayres in Universal's film version of All Quiet on the Western Front (1931). Sirk cast Gavin for the young actor's inexperience, fresh looks, and earnest manner. The film was not a success when it was released, although Gavin received praise for his performance.

A series of classic films
Before A Time to Love and a Time to Die had been released, Gavin was cast by Douglas Sirk supporting Lana Turner in Imitation of Life (1959). Unlike A Time to Love and a Time to Die, this was a box-office success and Gavin was voted most promising male newcomer for his performance in the film by the Motion Picture Exhibitor.

Gavin appeared as Julius Caesar in Universal's epic Spartacus (1960) directed by Stanley Kubrick. He was cast as Sam Loomis in the thriller Psycho (1960) for director Alfred Hitchcock. Gavin later claimed he was "terribly disturbed" by the sex and violence in Psycho, saying, "I think Hitch really got frosted with me." Both films were successful, critically and commercially.

Following the success of Imitation of Life, Gavin was often cast as the handsome opposite to leading ladies but as characters who were permitted little action. He co-starred against Doris Day in the thriller Midnight Lace, Sophia Loren in the comedic A Breath of Scandal (both 1960), Susan Hayward in the melodrama Back Street and with Sandra Dee in Romanoff and Juliet and Tammy Tell Me True (all 1961). Most of these films were produced by Ross Hunter. He appeared periodically on television in various anthology series. He was directed by a young William Friedkin in the episode 'Off Season', S3, Ep29 of The Alfred Hitchcock Hour.

Gavin later claimed that he lacked training support from Universal during his early days there:When I walked through the gate, Universal quit building actors. All of a sudden I was doing leading roles. I knew I was a tyro but they told me to shut up and act. Some of those early roles were unactable. Even Laurence Olivier couldn't have done anything with them. The dialog included cardboard passages such as 'I love you. You can rely on me, darling. I'll wait.' It was all I could do to keep from adding, 'with egg on my face.'

Gavin disliked comparisons to Rock Hudson and in a 1960 interview said he considered quitting acting to take up law. He left Universal in 1962. He signed to make several movies in Europe including The Assassins, The Challenge and Night Call. However, he pulled out of The Assassins (which became Assassins of Rome (1965)), Night Call and The Challenge were never made. In early 1964, he starred in the TV series Destry. The series was not a ratings success and was cancelled.

Return to Universal
In September 1964, Gavin signed a new contract with Universal which gave him the option to take work outside the studio. He appeared in the television series, Convoy, which was cancelled after a short run. He appeared in Mexican film Pedro Páramo (1967), based on the novel by Juan Rulfo. His next role was that of Mary Tyler Moore's character's stuffy boyfriend in Universal's 1920s-era musical Thoroughly Modern Millie (1967). Gavin saw the role as an opportunity to parody his performances in Ross Hunter films.

In June 1966, Gavin signed a five-year non-exclusive contract with Universal. He was cast in the lead in OSS 117 – Double Agent (1968), then titled No Roses for Robert, replacing Frederick Stafford who was filming Alfred Hitchcock's Topaz. He acted in supporting roles in The Madwoman of Chaillot (1969) and Pussycat, Pussycat, I Love You (1970), in which he parodied his own image.

James Bond
Gavin was signed for the role of James Bond in the film Diamonds Are Forever (1971) after George Lazenby left the role. However, David Picker, head of United Artists, wanted the box-office assurance of Sean Connery. Gavin's contract was honored despite losing the role to Connery. According to Roger Moore's James Bond Diary, Gavin was slated to play Bond in Live and Let Die (1973), but Harry Saltzman insisted on a British actor for the role and Moore was given the part.

Screen Actors Guild
Gavin was on the board of the Screen Actors Guild (SAG) in 1965. He served a term as third vice president and two terms as president from 1971 to 1973. During his presidency Gavin testified before the Federal Trade Commission on phone talent rackets and met with President Richard Nixon to present the problem of excessive television reruns. He presented petitions to the federal government on the issues of prime-time access rules, legislative assistance for American motion pictures, and film production by the government using non-professional actors.

Gavin's presidency in the Screen Actors Guild came to an end when he was defeated by Dennis Weaver in 1973. Gavin was the first incumbent president to be defeated by an independent challenger.

Theatre
Gavin made a foray into live theatre in the 1970s, showcasing his baritone voice. He toured the summer stock circuit as El Gallo in a production of The Fantasticks at the South Shore Music Circus twentieth anniversary summer season June 29-July 4, 1970 in Massachusetts.

In 1973, Gavin replaced Ken Howard in the Broadway musical Seesaw opposite Michele Lee. Gavin said he first turned down the musical because of his unhappiness with the quality of the book but reconsidered when Michael Bennett asked him to join the cast. He played the role for seven months and toured the United States in the role with Lucie Arnaz. Both the Broadway and touring production were directed by Michael Bennett.

Later TV work
In the early 1970s, Gavin played Akhenaten in the television movie Nefertiti y Aquenatos (1973) alongside Geraldine Chaplin and Salah Zulfikar. In the late 1970s, Gavin played Cary Grant in the television movie Sophia Loren: Her Own Story (1980).

Politics

Gavin was cultural adviser to the Organization of American States from 1961 to 1965.

Ambassador to Mexico
A Republican, Gavin was appointed U.S. Ambassador to Mexico in June 1981 by President Ronald Reagan and served until June 1986.

Business career
In June 1986 following his work as ambassador to Mexico, Gavin became vice-president of Atlantic Richfield in federal and international relations. In 1987, he resigned to become president of Univisa Satellite Communications, a subsidiary of Univisa, the Spanish language broadcasting empire.

Gavin was president of Gamma Holdings, a global capital and consulting company which he helped found in 1968. He became chairman of Gamma Services International in January 1990. He served on the boards of Causeway Capital, the Hotchkis & Wiley Funds, the TCW Strategic Income Fund, Securitas Security Services USA, Inc., DII Industries, LLC, Claxson Interactive Group Inc., Anvita, Inc., the Latin America Strategy Board at HM Capital Partners LLC, Apex Mortgage Capital Inc., Krause's Furniture, Inc., Atlantic Richfield Co., International Wire Holdings Company and International Wire Group Holdings, Inc. Gavin served as senior counselor to Hicks Trans American Partners (a division of Hicks Holdings) and managing director and partner of Hicks, Muse, Tate & Furst (Latin America) from 1994 to 2001. He was an independent trustee of Causeway International Value Fund.

Gavin served on various pro bono boards, including UCLA's Anderson Graduate School of Management, Don Bosco Institute, the FEDCO Charitable Fund, the Hoover Institution, Loyola-Marymount University, the National Parks Foundation, Southwest Museum, the University of the Americas and Villanova Preparatory School.

Personal life
Gavin married actress Cicely Evans in 1957. They had two children and lived in Beverly Hills. The marriage ended in divorce in 1965. While making No Roses for Robert in Italy in 1967, Gavin dated co-star Luciana Paluzzi.

In 1974, Gavin married stage and television actress Constance Towers. The two were introduced at a party in 1957 by Gavin's godfather, Jimmy McHugh. Towers had two children from her previous marriage to Eugene McGrath. Gavin and Towers remained married until his death in 2018.

Gavin's daughter, Cristina, is an actress and his daughter, Maria, has a career in television production.

Death
Gavin died of complications from pneumonia after a long battle with leukemia on February 9, 2018, at his home in Beverly Hills, California.

Filmography

Film

Television

Theatre credits

The Fantastiks (1967) – Paper Mill Playhouse and The Cape Playhouse on Cape Cod, Massachusetts in 1970
Seesaw (1974) with Lucie Arnaz – Broadway and tour

Mr. Roberts (1968) - Papermill Playhouse

References

External links

 
 
 John Gavin – So Suave 
 

1931 births
2018 deaths
Businesspeople from Los Angeles 
American people of Chilean descent
American male actors of Mexican descent
American people of Irish descent
American male film actors
American male stage actors
Presidents of the Screen Actors Guild
Hispanic and Latino American diplomats
Hispanic and Latino American male actors
Ambassadors of the United States to Mexico
Latino conservatism in the United States
California Republicans
United States Navy officers
Military personnel from California
American military personnel of the Korean War
Stanford University alumni
Male actors from Los Angeles
Deaths from leukemia
Deaths from pneumonia in California
New Star of the Year (Actor) Golden Globe winners